Spiros Exaras is a Greek guitarist, composer, producer and arranger.

Career 
He has performed and recorded with Mariah Carey Shirley Bassey Mark Murphy Gerardo Velez, Philip Hamilton, Charles Blenzig, Mike Pope, Andy Middleton, Randy Brecker, Joel Rosenblatt, Jon Benitez, Tessa Souter, Dave Valentin, Arturo O'Farrill Evanthia Reboutsika, Mario Frangoulis, Kostas Hatzis, Elias Andriopoulos, Alkistis Protopsalti, Yannis Markopoulos, Kostas Karalis and Antonis Kaloyannis, among others.

Albums 

 Spiros Exaras plays Kostas Hatzis - MBI Records 1992 
 Everything For A Reason (Original Motion Picture Soundtrack) - Polyglottal Music 2000
 Niko's Restaurant (Original Motion Picture Soundtrack) - Polyglottal Music 2001
 Gallathea (Original Theatre Soundtrack) - Polyglottal Music 2002
 Phrygianics --- Spiros Exaras World Jazz Ensemble - Blue Note Records 2003
 Old Waters New River — Spiros Exaras/Ellio Villafranca - Harbinger Records 2014
 Just Cause (Original Motion Picture Soundtrack) - Polyglottal Music 2014
 Mark Murphy feat Spiros Exaras : Live in Athens, Greece - Harbinger Records  2016
 Stis Paralies Tou Feggariou --- Spiros Exaras/Iakovos Kambanellis/Lina Orfanou- MLK 2016

EP's 

 Unbounded Blue (feat Randy Brecker, Mark Egan, Tom Schuman, Joel Rosenblatt, Don Harris, Tom "Bones" Malone, Alex Blake, Bill Harris, Gerardo Velez) - Polyglottal Music 1994
 The Dwarf Planets with Achilles Liarmakopoulos on trombone - Spiros Exaras Music 2020
The Magic of Christmas, feat. Eugene Ruffolo and Amanda Homi (Polyglottal Music 2021)

Singles 

 I Will Never Forget - Achilles Liarmakopoulos, Spiros Exaras - AL Music, Polyglottal Music 2019
La Ruta (featuring Nancy Ticotin) - Polyglottal Music 2020
Yanni mou to Mandili sou/Take 5 - Loukia Valasi/Spiros Exaras  (Apollon Productions/Polyglottal Music, 2021) 
Christmas Fantasy - Achilles Liarmakopoulos, Spiros Exaras  (AL Music 2021)

Other Discography  
 George Mouzakis-Lakis Lazopoulos : Eho Apopse Rendez-Vous (Sony Greece- 1992) - (guitarist)
 John Modinos : Our Roots (Alfa Mi - 1993) - (guitarist)
 Thomas Bakalakos : Ap'Tin Ellada Ya Hara (Alpha Mi Records, 1993) - (guitarist) 
 Mariah Carey : My All & Breakdown (Sony Music - 1998) - (guitarist)
 Man-Yee Lam : Awakened to a Dream (Starlight Music - 2000) - (guitarist)
 Aris Tomas : Wild World (Wizard Records, 2003) - (guitarist, producer) 
 Christie : Who Needs Love (Christie Productions - 2005) - (guitarist)
 Richard Khuzami : Fused (Dahdoo Records - 2006) - (guitarist)
 Lina Orfanos : Enchanted Night (Romanos Productions - 2007) - (guitarist, producer, arranger)
 Mitch Zorba : Zorba (Young Pals Music - 2009) - (guitarist, co-writer, co-producer) 
 Emre Yilmaz : Kaderin Yerine (Yasar Kekeva Plakcılık - 2011) - (guitarist, arranger producer)
 Argyro Kaparou : Xeirolaves (R-Time - 2012) - (guitarist) 
 Angeliki : Middle Earth Sea (Angel Bee Productions - 2013) - (guitarist, arranger, producer)
 Dimitris Maramis-Lina Orfanos : Ay Amor (Romanos Productions - 2013) - (guitarist)
 Amanda Homi : Till I Reach Bombay (Drumgirl - 2013) - (guitarist, arranger)
 Tasso Zapanti : Reflections Upon  (Zapanti Music - 2014) - (guitarist)
 Lina Orfanos : Mathausen/Desserters (Babinis Productions - 2015) - (guitarist, arranger, producer)
 Achilles Liarmakopoulos : Trombone Atrevido (ODEG - 2015), (guitarist, arranger, composer, producer)
 Νικοs Platyrachos/George Dalaras : Ta Astega (Feelgood Records - 2015) - (guitar)
 Lina Orfanos : Essentially Ella (Babinis Productions - 2016) - (guitarist, arranger, producer) 
 Doros Dimosthenous : Compere (Purple Lily Records, 2016) - (guitarist) 
 Achilles Liarmakopoulos : Ethereal - (AL 2017) - (guitarist, composer, arranger, producer) 
Nikos Platyrachos/Dimitris Lentzos : Mavri Mpogia sto Marmaro  (MLK, 2018) - (guitarist) 
Korina Legaki, George Andreou, Nikos Xydakis : Neos Kosmos (Mikri Arktos, 2019) - (guitarist) 
Lina Orfanos : Dream (Bambinis Productions, 2019) - (composer, guitarist, arranger, producer) 
Lina Orfanos - Love Matters (Bambinis/Romanos Productions, 2021) - (guitarist, arranger, producer) 
Aggeliki: Samba Griega (Rtime, Polyglottal Music 2021)-(arranger, producer, guitarist)

Featured in Compilations 
 ROW : Rivers of the World  (ROW - 2001) - (guitarist)
 KOSMOS 93.6 : Ethnic Collection (Universal Music/MINOS 2005) -(composer, arranger, guitarist, producer) 
 Various Artists  (Lyra- 2008) - (guitarist, arranger)

Music for Film and Theater 
 Everything for a reason- 2000 - directed by Vlas Parlapanides, written by Vlas and Charles Parlapanides, executive producer Larry Meistrich 
 Niko's restaurant - 2001(short) -written by Evan Camfield and Efterpi Charalambidis, directed by efterpi Charalambidis
 Just Cause - 2014(short) -written and directed by Paul Krisikos
 Gallathea (play) (2002)

References 

Living people
Greek musicians
Year of birth missing (living people)